Coldstream is a community in the Canadian province of Nova Scotia, located in  Colchester County. It was named for Coldstream in the Scottish Borders.

References

Coldstream on Destination Nova Scotia

Communities in Colchester County
General Service Areas in Nova Scotia